The Donkey Show can refer to:

The Donkey Show (band), a 1980s ska musical group
The Donkey Show (musical), a disco version of Midsummer Night's Dream
The Donkey Show (radio program), a radio show on KFLY-FM (Eugene) and 106.3 KZZE (Rogue Valley), Oregon

See also
Donkey show, a semi-fictitious sex show found in Tijuana, Mexico